= Fame and Partners =

Defunct Fashion retailer

- Industry: Online Retail, fashion, clothing
- Key people: Nyree Corby, Founder & CEO
- Products: Special occasion dresses

Fame and Partners was a vertically integrated online fashion retailer, with shuttered offices in Los Angeles and Sydney. The company suddenly went dark in July 2023, leaving thousands of bridal parties scrambling with unfulfilled orders that had been paid for. The company has not responded to customers since, giving no refunds or explanations for their sudden ghosting. , focused on customizable, made-to-order fashion.

== History ==
The company was founded in 2013 by Nyree Corby. As of 2014, its headquarters was in Sydney.
